Hanggang Saan (International title: A Mother's Guilt / ) is a 2017 Philippine crime drama television series starring real-life mother-and-son Sylvia Sanchez and Arjo Atayde, together with Sue Ramirez, Maris Racal, Yves Flores, Teresa Loyzaga and Ariel Rivera. The series premiered on ABS-CBN's Kapamilya Gold afternoon block and worldwide on The Filipino Channel on November 27, 2017, to April 27, 2018, replacing The Promise of Forever.

Plot
This fictional television series follows the lives of two women whose contrasting lives cross paths one desperate day when wrong choices and a tragic incident change their lives forever. Sonya Alipio (Sylvia Sanchez), is a low-income single mother of two boys, Paco and Domeng, who works hard for her family, deposits a portion of her hard-earned money every month into a financial educational plan sold by an established company called Educare to ensure her sons have the funds for their college or university.

When Sonya is unable to cash out her investments in Educare to pay for her son's heart surgery, she confronts Educare's president Edward Lamoste (Eric Quizon). The confrontation turns ugly when Edward begs her to kill him instead so his wife and child benefit from his life insurance. As both struggle with the gun, Edward is shot. Frightened and ignorant about due process, Mang Asyong (Sonya's friend who witnesses the altercation) urges her to run away while he disposes of the gun. Back at the hospital, her son's operation is successful. Edward is also rushed to the hospital and declared dead on arrival.

Jean Lamoste is Edward's widow and mother of a young daughter, Ana who is as old as Paco. The two women meet at the hospital chapel and a bond is forged as two strangers comfort each other. Jean vows to seek her husband's murderer, while Sonya is torn between reporting the truth to the authorities. Her friend Asyong advises her not to abandon her young sons by going to jail. She decides to follow his advice when someone else, a disgruntled policy holder, is accused and jailed for the murder.

Twelve years later, the two women's lives cross paths once again when their children become acquainted.  Her son Paco (Arjo Atayde) is a lawyer, bar exam top-notcher and Ana (Sue Ramirez) is a New York-trained chef planning to open a restaurant in Manila.  They fall in love, a relationship that is welcomed at first, then opposed because of the conflict arising from subsequent events between the Alipio and Montecillos. As relations become adversarial between both families, Ana and Paco decide to end their relationship. Paco moves on and falls in love with his colleague Atty. Georgette San Diego.

Through the years, while Sonya thinks her past is behind her, Jean marries her husband's partner Jacob Montecillo (Ariel Rivera) and focuses her time on a new advocacy: reaching out to Educare's policy holders as redemption for Educare's failure. Jean recognizes Sonya as the same woman in the hospital the night Edward died and learns later that she was an Educare policy holder.

When new developments in Edward's murder investigation surfaces, a heavy conscience drives Sonya to give herself up and she is charged and imprisoned. Paco is the lead counsel defending her, assisted by his law school classmate and girlfriend, Atty. Georgette San Diego (Maxine Medina), and together they set out to prove Sonya's innocence. After analyzing the forensic evidence presented to them at Discovery, both lawyers question the verifiability of Sonya's statements. They find two crucial evidence missing, Edward's gun and the ballistic report establishing the real assassin's gun as the weapon that killed him.

Unknown by all, Edward's real killer is an assassin hired by Jacob Montecillo, Edward's childhood best friend and business partner. Jacob has long coveted Edward's life, his wife, money and his father's admiration, so he steals Educare's funds, has Edward killed and marries his widow. Sonya's unexpected visit that night creates a perfect cover and helps him get away with murder. He later has his right-hand man Roman retrieve and dispose all evidence linking him to Edward's murder and Educare's bankruptcy.

At the summation in Sonya's trial, the Judge hands Sonya a guilty verdict for homicide, but not first-degree murder. Instead of a life sentence, she receives a 15-year sentence, granting her bail to allow her legal team to prepare for her appeal. Sonya accepts this as retribution for the 12 years she robbed Gabriel for a crime she knew he did not commit. Nevertheless, her family and legal team pursue the unknown shooter angle, leading them to Jacob's direct connection with Educare's bankruptcy and Edward Lamoste's murder.

Meanwhile, characters related to Jacob Montecillo suffer misfortunes as Jacob begins to get rid of all evidence and contacts linking him to Educare's illegal transactions. Julia, the bank manager directly involved with Jacob and Educare is found dead from an apparent suicide, but authorities are considering foul play, leading to an NBI deep dive of Julia's dealings with Educare. Katrina, Jean's former assistant possessing evidence of Jacob's illegal money transfers to the fictitious Editha Fuentabella account, is kidnapped and eventually killed. Jacob kills his right-hand man, Roman when he turns himself over to Paco as a material witness against Jacob. Yaya Letty (Ces Quesada), Ana and Jean's long-time retainer, approaches Paco with her insights about Jacob Montecillo, admitting she witnessed Jacob suspiciously throw something over the bridge when she followed him one evening. This draws Ana and Paco to collaborate with Georgette, and the three find credible evidence proving Jacob's involvement. Ana who suspects Jacob's direct hand in her father's death urges her mother to leave him. Angered by Ana's allegations, Jacob arranges to have her killed along with the Alipios, all narrowly losing their lives to several assassination attempts. Jean later discovers Jacob's murder list. Furious at his duplicity, she enlists an unlikely ally to help bring down Jacob: Sonya. To protect their children from Jacob's wrath, the two mothers decide to secretly work together. Jean pretends to remain by Jacob's side as she gathers evidence of Jacob's illegal activities and leaks it to social media and Atty. Vega's legal team.

Elsewhere, Forensic investigation unearths Edward's missing gun and a bullet lodged in the breastplate of the Virgin Mary statue, and the crime lab verifies it as the bullet fired from his gun, clearing Sonya of the crime. Sadly, tragedy hits Atty. Vega's camp when Atty. Georgette is killed by Jacob's assassins as she fights to protect the integrity of the evidence and Paco is devastated. Nonetheless, Atty. Vega's camp bring Jacob to trial as the mastermind of Edward's murder, the attempted murder of Paco and Domeng, and the embezzlement of Educare.

The beleaguered Jacob attempts to leave the country twice and Jean alerts Sonya's legal team both times. A departure hold was handed the first time, with Jacob landing in jail. Although charged with a non bailable offense, his influence extends to a judge who grants him bail. On their second attempt, Jacob and Jean try to leave on a yacht at the Freeport Area of Bataan that would take them to the southernmost part of Mindanao, the backdoor exit from the Philippines. Jean alerts Sonya again. Despite the NBI's full participation, Jacob manages to avoid capture and Jean is shot in the crossfire. Jacob becomes the subject of a nationwide manhunt but is subsequently captured when he visits Jean's gravesite.

Finale
At Jacob's trial, Atty. Vega's team presents solid evidence and witness testimonies of Jacob's crimes, including a testimony from Don Miguel Montecillo, Jacob's father, who confirms his wife overheard Jacob discuss Edward's murder over the phone. Jacob retaliates with a series of bombings targeting Sonya's family, Atty. Vega and Ana Lamoste which results to Don Miguel's death.

The court finds Jacob guilty on all counts, with a life sentence for Edward Lamoste's murder. Despite the guilty verdicts, the Alipios and the Lamostes are uneasy, more so after Jean visits Jacob in prison. Realizing that Jean's death was a trap to lure him in, Jacob's grief over his father's death turns to rage and he warns Jean that he would kill the Alipios as revenge for everything that went wrong in his life. Not willing to take any chances, Jean and Sonya prepare to leave and start new lives, the Lamostes to Seattle and the Alipios to Cebu. Jacob executes his revenge, blackmailing his politician uncle to allow him to escape prison, use his private properties to lure and kill the Alipios. He kidnaps Jean and Sonya, using them as baits for their children to rescue them. Ana and the local enforcement team figures out Jacob's hiding place for her mother, successfully rescues Jean, but the uncle divulges another bombshell: Jacob used two separate hiding locations so he could keep Jean away from any crossfire as he guns down the Alipios. The NBI works with the Alipio brothers to rescue Sonya, but Jacob manages to capture Paco and Domeng and proceeds to terrorize them in front of their mother. Shots are fired when they try to escape, critically wounding Sonya and Paco but Paco manages to kill Jacob.

“Evil will not always win. Good will always triumph though we often wondered why we had to suffer for Jacob’s crimes. But in the end, Jacob did pay with his life and Justice was served.” Domeng points this out during an interview for a national TV documentary on Jacob Montecillo and the Edward Lamoste murder.  Joining him at the interview were his mother and brother Paco who had both survived the shooting.

Five years later after the incident, Domeng is a successful architect who designs and constructs their new home while Paco is Senior Partner of the Law Firm of Vega Alipio & Associates. The Alipios and Lamostes are healed of the trauma Jacob wrought on their lives. Ana returns from Seattle, looks for and finds Paco who is on vacation with his mom and brother at Baler.  They get together and resume their relationship.

Cast and characters

Main cast
 Sylvia Sanchez as Sonya Magat-Alipio
 Arjo Atayde as Atty. Francisco "Paco" Alipio
 Yves Flores as Ar. Dominic "Domeng" Garibay-Alipio
 Sue Ramirez as Anna Michelle Lamoste
 Ariel Rivera as Jacob Montecillo
 Teresa Loyzaga as Jean Saavedra-Lamoste/Montecillo

Supporting cast
 Maris Racal as Vanessa "Nessa" Gonzales
 Nanding Josef as Asyong
 Ces Quesada as Letty
 Maxine Medina as Atty. Georgette Sandiego
 Rommel Padilla as John Joseph "Jojo" Lagrimas
 Karl Medina as Dindo
 Anna Luna as Rizalina "Lina" Bonifacio
 Maila Gumila as Atty. Lorna Vega
 Junjun Quintana as Roman Mataya
 Jenny Miller as Katrina
 Sue Prado as Marjorie
 Claire Ruiz as Atty. Joanne Dimalanta
 Sharmaine Suarez as Mabel Gonzales
 Marlo Mortel as Unyo
 Mercedes Cabral as Carolina Dela Guerra
 Viveika Ravanes as Cora
 Arnold Reyes as Gabriel Dela Guerra
 Fred Lo as Brian Climaco
 Rolando Inocencio as Atty. Balmaceda
 Marco Gumabao as Archie
 Mari Kaimo as Judge Ignacio Tortuga
 Rubi Rubi as Pinky
 Christopher Tan as Rico
 Tanya Gomez as Mayora
 Nikko Natividad as Samboy

Special participation
 Eric Quizon as Edward Lamoste
 Carmi Martin as Margaret Cruz
 Yñigo Delen as young Dominic "Domeng" Alipio
 Luke Alford as young Francisco "Paco" Alipio
 Allyson McBride as young Anna Michelle Lamoste
 Levi Ignacio as Lester Lee
 Alicia Alonzo as Doña Miranda Montoya-Montecillo
 Robert Arevalo as Don Miguel Montecillo

Accolades

International adaptation
A Turkish adaptation titled  ("A Mother's Guilt") aired on Kanal D every Saturday 8:00 p.m., from November 21, 2020, to December 19, 2020. It had five episodes with a running time of 130 minutes each. This was the first Turkish adaptation of a Philippine soap opera.

See also
 List of programs broadcast by ABS-CBN
 List of drama series of ABS-CBN

References

External links
 

ABS-CBN drama series
Philippine romance television series
Philippine action television series
Philippine crime television series
Philippine thriller television series
2017 Philippine television series debuts
2018 Philippine television series endings
Filipino-language television shows
Television shows filmed in the Philippines